Cities considered to have significant Chinese-American populations are large U.S. cities or municipalities with a critical mass of at least 1% of the total urban population; medium-sized cities with a critical mass of at least 1% of their total population; and small cities with a critical mass of at least 10% of the total population.

According to the 2012 Census estimates, the three metropolitan areas with the largest Chinese-American populations were the Greater New York Combined Statistical Area at 735,019 people, the San Jose-San Francisco-Oakland Combined Statistical Area at 629,243 people, and the Greater Los Angeles Combined Statistical Area at about 566,968 people. In the post-1965 era, first- and second-generation immigrants include those from Mainland China, Hong Kong, Macau, and Taiwan. Also included in the Chinese-American population enumeration are ethnic Chinese from Malaysia and Vietnam who might identify themselves as Chinese, thus skewing the census reporting.

New York City is home to by far the highest Chinese-American population of any city proper, with an estimated  573,388 Chinese-Americans in New York City, significantly higher than the total of the next five cities combined; multiple large Chinatowns in Manhattan, Brooklyn (three), and Queens (three) are thriving as traditionally urban enclaves, as large-scale Chinese immigration continues into New York, with the largest metropolitan Chinese population outside Asia. The Los Angeles County city of Monterey Park has the highest percentage of Chinese-Americans of any municipality, at 43.7% of its population, or 24,758 people. The San Gabriel Valley region of Los Angeles County is the single largest concentration of combined Chinese and Taiwanese Americans in the country, having a collections of U.S. suburbs with large foreign-born Chinese-speaking populations, ranging from working-class individuals residing in Rosemead and El Monte to wealthier immigrants living in Arcadia, San Marino, and Diamond Bar. A similar demographic shift has also taken place in the southern half of the San Francisco Bay Area. Conversely, the suburbs of New York City within the state of New Jersey are notable for their widespread and increasing prevalence of Chinese-Americans (see list below), reflecting their general affluence and propensity for professional occupation.

Metropolitan areas with more than 20,000 Chinese-Americans
The list of metropolitan areas with a Chinese-American population of 20,000 or more .

Large-sized cities
The list of large cities (population greater than 250,000) with a Chinese-American population of at least 1% of the total population, .

New York City boroughs

As the city proper with the nation's largest Chinese-American population by a wide margin, with an estimated 562,205 in 2016 by the 2010-2016 American Community Survey, and as the primary destination for new Chinese immigrants, New York City is subdivided into official municipal boroughs, which themselves are home to significant Chinese populations, with Brooklyn and Queens, adjacently located on Long Island, leading the fastest growth. After the City of New York itself, the boroughs of Queens and Brooklyn encompass the largest Chinese populations, respectively, of all municipalities in the United States.

Medium-sized cities
List of medium-sized cities (population between 100,000 and 250,000) with a Chinese-American population of at least one percent of the total population, according to the American Community Survey.

Small-sized cities
The following is a list of places in the United States with a population fewer than 100,000 in which at least three percent (five percent in Los Angeles or San Francisco Bay areas) of the total population is Chinese, according to the 2010-2015 American Community Survey, and the 2010 U.S. Census for the U.S. territories.

American Samoa

California

Greater Los Angeles Area

The majority of the Chinese-American population of more than 400,000 in Los Angeles County lives within the San Gabriel Valley, which is particularly noted for cities that have a large Chinese-American ethnic plurality. The following cities have the highest percentage of Chinese-Americans in Greater Los Angeles.

San Francisco Bay Area
Traditionally centered in San Francisco and Chinatown Oakland, the suburbanization of the Bay Area's Chinese-American population has resulted in significant concentrations in the southwestern East Bay, eastern Peninsula, and northern Santa Clara County. Chinese enclaves have also formed in many of these cities, in a similar manner to that of Southern California's San Gabriel Valley.

Delaware

Georgia

Guam

Hawaii

Indiana

New Jersey

Northern Mariana Islands

Within Saipan, villages with significant Chinese populations include Garapan (19.7% Chinese), Chalan Piao (18.1% Chinese), Chalan Kanoa IV (15.1% Chinese), and San Antonio (19.8% Chinese).

Ohio

Texas

Washington
The overwhelming majority of these cities are in King County, while three others (Edmonds, Lynnwood, and Mill Creek) are in Snohomish County. Pullman is in Whitman County.

See also
 Chinatown
 List of U.S. cities with Asian American majority populations
 List of U.S. cities with large Japanese-American populations
 List of U.S. cities with significant Korean-American populations
 List of U.S. cities with large Vietnamese-American populations
 Lists of U.S. cities with large ethnic identity populations
 Palmdale, California

Notes

References

Further reading
 Wei Li. "Building Ethnoburbia: The Emergence and Manifestation of the Chinese Ethnoburb in Los Angeles' San Gabriel Valley." Journal of Asian American Studies 2(1): 1-28 (1999).

Chinese-American
Chinese American
Chinese